Martina Hingis was the defending champion, but did not compete this year.

Amélie Mauresmo won the title by defeating Sandrine Testud 6–4, 7–6(7–3) in the final.

Seeds
The first four seeds received a bye into the second round.

Draw

Finals

Top half

Bottom half

Qualifying

Qualifying seeds

Qualifiers

Qualifying draw

First qualifier

Second qualifier

Third qualifier

Fourth qualifier

References

External links
 Official results archive (ITF)
 Official results archive (WTA)

Dubai Duty Free Women's Open - Singles
Singles